The Dongpo Academy or Dongpo Shuyuan, was an academy located in Hainan, China. It was originally built in 1098 in memory of the Song dynasty literary figure, Su Dongpo, who was exiled here. 

The Zaijiutang (载酒堂 Zài jiǔ táng) is the building where Su Dongpo lived and gave lectures during exile. The Dongpo Academy is located near the town of Zhonghe, 40 km from Danzhou (Nada) city. It is now a tourist attraction.

References 

Confucian education
Confucianism in China
1098 establishments in Asia
History of education in China
Chinese philosophy
Song dynasty
11th-century establishments in China
Major National Historical and Cultural Sites in Hainan